Glendene is a suburb of West Auckland, in New Zealand. It is under the local governance of the Auckland Council. 

Glendene is a mainly residential suburb with the north-eastern portion devoted to light industry.

History
Glendene is named after a farm in the area owned by Percy Jones, which was later subdivided for housing. The Western shores of the Whau River were home to many clay and pottery yards in the late 19th and early 20th centuries, including the Malam, Laurie, Black & Scott and Hepburn yards. Most of the development of Glendene as a residential suburb occurred in the 1960s and 1970s.

In April 2014, Glendene became a part of the new Kelston electorate.

The Glendene Community Hub was opened in March 2015 in response to Council studies that showed a need for community development in the area.

Demographics

Glendene had a population of 7,563 at the 2018 New Zealand census, an increase of 642 people (9.3%) since the 2013 census, and an increase of 942 people (14.2%) since the 2006 census. There were 2,226 households, comprising 3,819 males and 3,747 females, giving a sex ratio of 1.02 males per female, with 1,626 people (21.5%) aged under 15 years, 1,686 (22.3%) aged 15 to 29, 3,468 (45.9%) aged 30 to 64, and 789 (10.4%) aged 65 or older.

Ethnicities were 41.8% European/Pākehā, 14.0% Māori, 26.0% Pacific peoples, 30.2% Asian, and 4.0% other ethnicities. People may identify with more than one ethnicity.

The percentage of people born overseas was 38.9, compared with 27.1% nationally.

Although some people chose not to answer the census's question about religious affiliation, 33.6% had no religion, 41.8% were Christian, 1.0% had Māori religious beliefs, 7.9% were Hindu, 4.6% were Muslim, 1.9% were Buddhist and 2.0% had other religions.

Of those at least 15 years old, 1,143 (19.3%) people had a bachelor's or higher degree, and 1,110 (18.7%) people had no formal qualifications. 702 people (11.8%) earned over $70,000 compared to 17.2% nationally. The employment status of those at least 15 was that 3,087 (52.0%) people were employed full-time, 687 (11.6%) were part-time, and 345 (5.8%) were unemployed.

Education

The local primary school (years 1 - 6) is Glendene School (opened in 1965) It is coeducational.

Nearby secondary schools are Henderson High School, Kelston Boys' High School, Kelston Girls' College, Liston College and St Dominic's College.

Notes

External links
Photographs of Glendene held in Auckland Libraries' heritage collections. 
Glendene Community Society

Suburbs of Auckland
Henderson-Massey Local Board Area
Populated places around the Waitematā Harbour
West Auckland, New Zealand